Isaiah Spiller (born August 9, 2001) is an American football running back for the Los Angeles Chargers of the National Football League (NFL). He played college football at Texas A&M.

Early years
Spiller attended Klein Collins High School in Spring, Texas. During his career he had 3,587 yards from scrimmage and 53 touchdowns. Spiller played in the 2019 Under Armour All-America Game. He committed to Texas A&M University to play college football.

Spiller wears #28 as a tribute to former NFL running back C.J. Spiller, who played for five teams over eight seasons. The two are not related, but Isaiah would often watch C.J.'s highlights and imagine himself in the NFL.

College career
As a true freshman at Texas A&M in 2019, Spiller started nine of the 13 games. He was named freshman All-SEC after rushing for 946 yards on 174 carries with 10 touchdowns. He returned as the starter his sophomore year in 2020. During the 2020 season, in which he rushed 188 times for 1,036 yards and 9 touchdowns, Spiller was named to the all-SEC Coaches' first team. On December 14, 2021, after a season in which he rushed 179 times for 1,011 yards and 6 touchdowns, Spiller announced that he would be declaring for the 2022 NFL Draft and skipping the 2021 Gator Bowl.

Professional career

Spiller was drafted by the Los Angeles Chargers in the fourth round, 123rd overall, of the 2022 NFL Draft.

References

External links
 Los Angeles Chargers bio
Texas A&M Aggies bio

2001 births
Living people
People from Spring, Texas
Players of American football from Texas
Sportspeople from Harris County, Texas
American football running backs
Texas A&M Aggies football players
African-American players of American football
21st-century African-American sportspeople
Los Angeles Chargers players